The Lonoke County Courthouse is located at 301 North Center Street in downtown Lonoke, the county seat of Lonoke County, Arkansas.  It is a four-story masonry structure, finished in red brick, with cast stone trim and a raised brick basement.  The main facade has its entrance recessed behind an arcade of two-story Doric columns.  It was built in 1928 to a design by Little Rock architect H. Ray Burks.

The building was listed on the National Register of Historic Places in 1982.

See also

National Register of Historic Places listings in Lonoke County, Arkansas

References

Courthouses on the National Register of Historic Places in Arkansas
Neoclassical architecture in Arkansas
Government buildings completed in 1928
Buildings and structures in Lonoke, Arkansas
National Register of Historic Places in Lonoke County, Arkansas
Historic district contributing properties in Arkansas